Fluo-3 is a fluorescence indicator of intracellular calcium (Ca2+), developed by  Roger Y. Tsien and colleagues. It is used to measure Ca2+ inside living cells in flow cytometry, and confocal laser scanning microscopy using visible light excitation (compatible with argon laser sources operating at 488 nm). Fluo-3 and derivatives (Fluo-4, Fluo-5 etc) have also been widely used with two-photon excitation microscopy. Fluo-3 is an essentially nonfluorescent compound, but upon binding of Ca2+ its fluorescence increases sharply with an emission maximum at 525 nm suitable for conventionally used detectors designed for fluorescein isothiocyanate (FITC) measurements. This large change in fluorescence coupled with a good yield of photons provides very high contrast which allowed the detection of microscopic Ca2+ release events inside cells called "Calcium sparks". Whereas the salts of fluo-3 are unable to penetrate cells, loading can be achieved using its acetoxymethyl (AM) ester derivative. Once inside the cell, unspecific esterases cleave the ester effectively trapping fluo-3.

As calcium is a key second messenger within cells, the specific properties of fluo-3 enable researchers to investigate the time-resolved dynamics of intracellular signal transduction in a diverse range of cells.

References

Cell imaging
Fluorone dyes
Acetic acids
Anilines
Phenol ethers
Chloroarenes